Dame Clara Hedwig Frances Furse DBE (born 16 September 1957) was the Chief Executive of the London Stock Exchange between January 2001 and May 2009, and was the first woman to occupy the position. In 2005, she was ranked 19th in Fortune magazine's most powerful women in business list. In 2007, Furse was listed among Time 100 most influential people in the world.

Biography
Furse was born in Canada to Dutch parents, and educated at schools in Colombia, Denmark, and Britain. She graduated from the London School of Economics in 1979 with a BSc in economics.

Clara Furse is the Chair of HSBC UK. She is also a non-executive Director of Vodafone plc. and Assicurazioni Generali S.p,A. She is a member of the Panel of Senior Advisors to Chatham House and of Bocconi University's International Advisory Council.

In March 2021 she became Chair of the UK Voluntary Carbon Markets Forum, establishing a group that aims to operationalise a global, high integrity market for voluntary carbon credits; an essential component of an accelerated and economically productive transition to net zero. In 2012, she chaired the Lead Expert Group of the UK government's Office for Science Foresight project on The Future of Computer Trading in Financial Markets.

She was a non-executive Director of Amadeus IT Group S.A. from 2010 to 2022. She was an External Member of the Bank of England's Financial Policy Committee (FPC), a policymaker on the new statutory body and macroprudential regulator from April 2013 until October 2016. She was a non-executive Director of Nomura Holdings from June 2010 to March 2017. For six years until April 2017, she was on the board of the UK's Department for Work and Pensions and latterly its lead independent Director.

From January 2001 to May 2009 she was Chief Executive of the London Stock Exchange, a FTSE 100 company. During this period she was also a non-executive Director of Euroclear plc, LCH Clearnet Group Ltd., Fortis SA and a member of the Shanghai International Financial Advisory Council. From 2009 to 2013, she was a non-executive Director of Legal & General plc.

Prior to joining the Exchange, Furse was Group Chief Executive of Credit Lyonnais Rouse from 1998 to 2000. Before that she spent 15 years at UBS.

Furse's career has spanned a broad range of global financial markets. She began her career in 1979 as a broker, joining Phillips & Drew in 1983. At UBS she became a Managing Director in 1995 and Global Head of Futures in 1996. During the 1990s she also served as a non-executive Director, committee chair and Deputy Chair of the London International Financial Futures and Options Exchange.

Damehood
She was appointed Dame Commander of the Order of the British Empire (DBE) in the 2008 Birthday Honours.

London Stock Exchange
Furse listed the 200-year-old exchange on its own market in 2001. Very strong growth followed a major technology upgrade to Tradelect and an international focus to its listings business. Tradelect eventually provided sub-millisecond trading, consistently setting new records for latency in exchange trading.  Daily electronic trading volumes grew by 82% and profits grew by 52% in 2007, the Exchange announced, allowing it to recoup the full £40m cost of investment in under a year. This rapid growth prompted a record five unsolicited or hostile bids in under two and half years from late 2004 to early 2007. Deutsche Boerse, Euronext, Macquarie, and Nasdaq (who twice failed to acquire the Exchange despite garnering nearly 30% of the stock), launched bids at prices from £5.30 to £12.43. The Exchange conducted an unprecedented number of successful bid defenses before completing its merger with Borsa Italiana in October 2007, which provided the foundation for a diversification into derivatives, fixed income, clearing and settlement. In 2011, the new CEO replaced Tradelect with an even faster trading engine developed by Millennium IT in Sri Lanka.

Fortis
Furse was a non-executive Director of Fortis when the Belgian bank, in partnership with Royal Bank of Scotland and Santander, purchased ABN Amro in 2008. The acquisition led to the bailout of Fortis which was subsequently sold off in parts to the Belgian and Dutch states and BNP Paribas.

See also
Deutsche Börse
Frankfurt Stock Exchange

References

Clara Furse: A profile from the BBC (January 2001)
London Stock Exchange Press release announcing Furse's appointment as chief executive.
"UK stock exchange defends its boss". BBC News (February 2003)
BBC Radio 4 Woman's Hour – Timeline: Clara Furse

1957 births
Alumni of the London School of Economics
British chief executives
Living people
Dames Commander of the Order of the British Empire
Place of birth missing (living people)
British people of Dutch descent
21st-century English businesswomen
21st-century English businesspeople
Advisors to Chatham House
London Stock Exchange people
Directors of Amadeus IT Group